The 1973 Spanish Grand Prix was a Formula One motor race held at Montjuïc circuit on 29 April 1973. It was race 4 of 15 in both the 1973 World Championship of Drivers and the 1973 International Cup for Formula One Manufacturers. The 75-lap race was won by Lotus driver Emerson Fittipaldi after he started from seventh position. François Cevert finished second for the Tyrrell team and Shadow driver George Follmer came in third, scoring his only podium finish in Formula One.

Classification

Qualifying

Race

Championship standings after the race

Drivers' Championship standings

Constructors' Championship standings

Note: Only the top five positions are included for both sets of standings.

References

Spanish Grand Prix
Spanish Grand Prix
1973 in Spanish motorsport
Spanish